Premada Putri is a 1957 Indian Kannada-language film, directed, produced and enacted by R. Nagendra Rao. Besides Nagendra Rao, the film stars Udayakumar, Sandhya  and Gummadi. R. N. K. Prasad was introduced in this film. The film won the National Film Award for Best Feature Film in Kannada at the 5th National Film Awards.
The film had musical score and soundtrack composed by H. R. Padmanabha Shastry and T. G. Lingappa to the lyrics of R. N. Jayagopal and Prabhakar Shastry.

Plot
Film director Mohan Rao and his wife Sushilamma are happy couple. Sushilamma has a good friend in Parvathi whose gentle behavior and innocence have captured her love. Parvathi's husband, Shankarappa, is a vagabond and thief and is crazy after money. Sarasa is their only daughter.

One night, some jewels were stolen from Mohan Rao's house. Police arrest Shankarappa, while trying to hock the jewels in Marwari's shop. But Parvathi, who doesn't know that her husband is a thief runs to Sushilamma to seek help and advice. Here she learns that her husband has stolen the jewels from the very persons from whom she sought solace. She begs Mohan Rao to save her husband from prison. Mohan Rao, overcome with pity, informs the police that the complaint given was wrong and that his wife had given the jewels to them without his knowledge. But Shankarappa doesn't leave his old ways. In the end, he and his wife are arrested on a charge of murder and dacoity and convicted.

Hearing of this, Sushilamma tries to meet Parvathi; but is unsuccessful. She then learns that her daughter Sarasa has been left at orphanage, goes there and brings her home. The couple decided to adopt her. Sushilamma informs Parvathi of this through letter. Parvathi is overjoyed and relieved at hearing this.

Cast
 Udayakumar
 Sandhya
 R. Nagendra Rao
 Sri Ranjini
 Gummadi

Soundtrack

Awards
 1957 - National Film Award for Best Feature Film in Kannada

References

External links 

 Movie info
 Premada Putri songs at Raaga

1957 films
1950s Kannada-language films
Indian black-and-white films
Films scored by T. G. Lingappa
Best Kannada Feature Film National Film Award winners